The 2001 Currie Cup qualification series was the first stage of the 63rd season of the Currie Cup, South Africa's premier domestic rugby union competition, since it started in 1889. The competition was known as the Bankfin Currie Cup for sponsorship reasons and this stage was contested from 4 June to 13 September 2001.

Competition rules and information
There were fourteen participating teams in the 2001 Currie Cup qualification series. These teams were divided into two sections, Section X and Section Y. Teams played all the other teams in their section once over the course of the qualification series, either at home or away.

Teams received four points for a win and two points for a draw. Bonus points were awarded to teams that scored four or more tries in a game, as well as to teams that lost a match by seven points or less. Teams were ranked by log points, then points difference (points scored less points conceded). The top four teams in each section qualified for the 2001 Currie Cup Top 8 and the bottom three teams in each section qualified for the 2001 Bankfin Cup.

Teams

Team listing

Log
The final log of the 2001 Currie Cup qualification series:

Matches
The following matches were played in the 2001 Currie Cup qualification series:

Section X

Round One

Round Two

Round Three

Round Four

Round Five

Round Six

Round Seven

Section Y

Round One

Round Two

Round Three

Round Four

Round Five

Round Six

Round Seven

References

2001
2001 Currie Cup